James Rash (born July 15, 1971) is an American actor, comedian, and filmmaker. He portrayed the role of Dean Craig Pelton on the NBC sitcom Community (2009–2015), for which he was nominated for the Critics' Choice Television Award for Best Supporting Actor in a Comedy Series in 2012. In that same year, he won the Academy Award for Best Adapted Screenplay and received a Golden Globe nomination as one of the writers of The Descendants.

Early life
Rash was born in Charlotte, North Carolina, on July 15, 1971. Both he and his sister were adopted. He attended Charlotte Latin School. After graduating, he spent a post-graduate year at the Lawrenceville School in Lawrenceville, New Jersey. He was a member of The Groundlings, the improv comedy group based in Los Angeles.

Career
Rash played Mr. Grayson/Stitches in the 2005 film Sky High, Fenton on That '70s Show, That '90s Show, and Andrew the "whore house guy" on Reno 911! He appeared in the final episode of Friends, and played Head T.A. Philip in Slackers. From 2009 to 2015, Rash starred on Community as Craig Pelton, the dean of the community college in which the show takes place.

Rash and comedy partner Nat Faxon moved into screenwriting with a pilot in 2005 for a series entitled Adopted, which did not take off. They wrote the screenplay for The Descendants (2011), based on the novel of the same name, which appeared on the 2008 edition of the Black List (the most popular unproduced scripts in Hollywood at that time). The film was released to critical acclaim, receiving a Golden Globe nomination and winning the Academy Award for Best Adapted Screenplay. However, the final script for The Descendants was largely re-written by screenwriters and directors Alexander Payne and Jim Taylor. Payne would go on to direct the film. In an interview with Vulture, Payne discussed an agreement between Payne/Taylor and Rash/Faxon. During the awards circuit for The Descendants, Rash/Faxon would deliver the acceptance speeches for all of the awards except the Academy Award; the Academy Award speech would be handled by Payne/Taylor.

Both Rash and Faxon co-wrote and co-directed the film The Way Way Back (2013), which received a standing ovation at its premiere at the Sundance Film Festival. Parts of the film are based on Rash's teenage life.

Rash has voiced the Marquess of Queensbury for all four seasons of the Adult Swim animated comedy Mike Tyson Mysteries. Since 2017, he has been the voice actor for Donald Duck universe character Gyro Gearloose in the reboot of DuckTales.

In 2023, Rash voiced the Fixer, the enforcer for the Conglomerate and recurring character in My Dad the Bounty Hunter. He also voiced a video game announcer in the same series.

Personal life
Rash stated he came out "well over 10-plus years ago" during an interview promoting Bros in September 2022.

Filmography

Film

Television

References

External links

 

1970 births
Living people
20th-century American comedians
21st-century American comedians
20th-century American male actors
21st-century American male actors
21st-century LGBT people
American adoptees
American film producers
American male comedians
American male film actors
American male television actors
American male voice actors
American male screenwriters
Best Adapted Screenplay Academy Award winners
Lawrenceville School alumni
American LGBT comedians
LGBT film directors
LGBT male actors
LGBT people from North Carolina
American LGBT screenwriters
Male actors from Charlotte, North Carolina
Male actors from North Carolina
Screenwriters from North Carolina
Writers from Charlotte, North Carolina
American LGBT actors